The 2014 Wokingham Borough Council election took place on Thursday 22 May 2014. That was the same day as other United Kingdom local elections in order to elect members of Wokingham Unitary Council in Berkshire, England. One third of the council was up for election and the Conservative Party stayed comfortably in overall control of the council.

After the election, the composition of the council was:
Conservative 44
Liberal Democrat 7
Labour 1
Independent 2

Background
A total of 79 candidates contested the 18 seats which were up for election. These included 18 Conservative, 18 Liberal Democrat, 14 Labour, 9 Green Party, 18 United Kingdom Independence Party and 1 independent candidates.

Issues in the election included:
Some recent controversial planning applications

Election result
The Conservatives retained control of the council. The Liberal Democrats held two out of the three seats they defended, retaining their seats in South Lake and Winnersh, but losing a seat in Bulmershe & Whitegates to Labour.

There were a total of 38,275 votes cast, including 204 spoiled ballots.

Ward results

References

2014 English local elections
2014
2010s in Berkshire